Chanel Iman Robinson (formerly Shepard) (born December 1, 1990) is an American model who has worked as a Victoria's Secret Angel. Vogue Paris declared her as one of the top 30 models of the 2000s.

Early life
Iman was born in Atlanta, Georgia in 1990. She grew up in Los Angeles, California. Her mother is  African American and a quarter Korean. Her father is African American.

Career

Modeling
Iman started modeling with Ford Models at the age of 12 as a child model in Los Angeles, California. She flew to New York in 2006 and won third place in Ford's Supermodel of the World contest. Shortly after, she signed on with the agency. She has appeared in editions  for Allure, Dubai, American, and Ukrainian Harpers Bazaar, V, i-D, Pop, Italian, British, and Indonesian Elle, Italian Vanity Fair, and several international Vogues. In February and July 2007, Iman appeared on the cover of Teen Vogue, with Karlie Kloss and Ali Michael, photographed by Patrick Demarchelier, then in November 2009 she appeared on the cover again, this time with Jourdan Dunn. Iman's other covers include American, British, and Italian Elle, American and French L'Officiel, i-D, Dubai and Ukrainian Harper's Bazaar, Lula, Korean, Teen, and American Vogue.

She has walked the runways for Burberry, Tom Ford, Gucci, Balenciaga, Max Mara, Versace, Yves Saint Laurent, Oscar de la Renta, Stella McCartney, DKNY, Moschino, Tommy Hilfiger, Jason Wu, Dior, Michael Kors, Hugo Boss, Ralph Lauren, Dolce & Gabbana, Kenzo, Hermés, Louis Vuitton, Alexander McQueen, Roberto Cavalli, Marc Jacobs, DSquared2, John Galliano, and Bottega Veneta.

She has appeared in advertising campaigns for Jean Paul Gaultier, Dolce & Gabbana, Ralph Lauren, DKNY, Bottega Veneta, DSquared2, Dennis Basso, Swarovski, XOXO, Benetton, J. Crew, Barneys New York, Saks Fifth Avenue, Lord & Taylor, GAP, Express, Mizani, and Victoria's Secret.

She has walked in the 2009,2010 and 2011 Victoria's Secret Fashion Show. In 2010, she became a Victoria's Secret Angel and was used in several of the company's campaigns.

Television
In October 2007, Iman appeared with her mother on an episode of the Tyra Banks Show. On March 21, 2009, she appeared as a correspondent in MTV's brief revival of House of Style with Bar Refaeli.
On September 9, 2009, Iman appeared as a guest judge on the two-hour season premiere of America's Next Top Model, Cycle 13 and also appeared on an episode of America's Next Top Model, Cycle 23 posing with the contestants of that cycle.

She also made an appearance on a January 2016 episode of Spike's Lip Sync Battle, as part of Olivia Munn's performance of Taylor Swift's "Bad Blood".

Acting
Iman appeared in the 2015 film Dope which premiered at the 2015 Sundance Film Festival. In 2017, Iman appeared in the Crackle original movie, Mad Families.

Other projects

Ventures
Early in 2010, Iman opened a clothing boutique in Culver City, California called The Red Bag with the help of her mother.
Iman appeared in Beyoncé's music video for "Yonce". She also appeared in singer Usher's music video for "Dive" and The Weeknd's music video for "Can't Feel My Face". In 2012, she attended the Met Ball with fashion designer Tom Ford.

Intel released a Kinect video game on Xbox Live Arcade starring Chanel Iman, Chris Evans and Redfoo of LMFAO. Iman signed a contract with Utah-based electronics company Skullcandy. For 2012, Iman was Sunglass Hut's summer ambassador along with Jourdan Dunn and Joan Smalls.
Iman was a model for Amazon Fashion's 2012 holiday campaign. In 2015, she appeared in Rick Famuyiwa’s Dope.

Philanthropy
In 2011, Iman traveled to East Africa on a work trip where she became one of a handful of celebrities attached to USAID and Ad Council's FWD campaign, an awareness initiative tied to that year's drought in East Africa. She joined Uma Thurman, Geena Davis and Josh Hartnett in TV and internet ads to "forward the facts" about the crisis. As an advocate for education, Chanel assists with setting up primary schools in impoverished rural areas in Tanzania and Uganda. Her passion for charity work led her to sponsor several young girls in Kenya as well, in which she contributes funds for their daily necessities and academic tuition.

In May 2011, editor-in-chief of American Vogue, Anna Wintour, chose Iman to co-host her Runway to Win fundraising event in Chicago. In conjunction with the event, Iman designed a backpack to raise money for President Barack Obama's 2012 campaign.

Personal life
In early 2013, Iman began dating rapper A$AP Rocky. In April 2014, they were reported to be engaged, however they separated in June 2014. In August 2015, it was confirmed that Iman was dating Lakers basketball player Jordan Clarkson, although they ended the relationship shortly after.

On December 2, 2017, Iman announced her engagement to New York Giants wide receiver Sterling Shepard. The couple married on March 3, 2018, at the Beverly Hills Hotel. The couple have two daughters: Cali born on August 10, 2018 and Cassie born on December 17, 2019. The couple announced they were getting divorced in January 2022.

References

External links

 
 
 The Internet Fashion Database
 
 Chanel Iman at Vogue.com
 
 
 

1990 births
African-American female models
American models of Korean descent
American people of Korean descent
Fairfax High School (Los Angeles) alumni
Living people
Female models from California
People from Atlanta
Models from Los Angeles
Female models from Georgia (U.S. state)
IMG Models models
Victoria's Secret Angels
21st-century African-American people
21st-century African-American women